Floyd "Breezy" Reid (September 4, 1927  in Bridgeton, New Jersey – March 15, 1994) was a  former American football running back who played for the Green Bay Packers of the National Football League.

Reid attended the University of Georgia.  He was selected in the ninth round (107th overall) of the 1950 NFL Draft by the Chicago Bears.

1927 births
1994 deaths
People from Bridgeton, New Jersey
American football running backs
Georgia Bulldogs football players
Green Bay Packers players